Match Performance Indicators (MPI) are the KPIs of sport. The term was created, and is widely used, in the scouting and analyzing system eye4TALENT.

Basically, the MPIs are set up as an indicator of a player's performance compared to a standard of a specific position on the field. When judging e.g. a football player's performance, it is then possible to compare his stats with the MPI of his playing position.

Since the introduction, the term has widely been used in various Danish media including Ekstra Bladet, BT, 6'eren and  Kontra Magazine.

Sports science